Primorskaya railway was located near Saint Petersburg and it lay on the route Saint Petersburg, Sestroretsk, Beloostrov. 
The railway was served by steam locomotives from the moment of opening and before joining to Oktyabrskaya railway in 1925.

Joint-stock company
Many articles refer to the "Joint-stock company of the Prinorskaya St.-Peterburg-Sestroretsk railway". It is not known whether the misspelling of Primorskaya actually appeared in the company's title. The title implies that the western terminus of the railway was intended to be Primorsk but it did not reach Primorsk within the lifetime of the company.

Construction
The line was constructed in three parts:
 Ozerki line, opened July 23, 1893
 Primorskaya Line
 first stage opened July 12, 1894
 second stage opened October 31, 1894
 third stage opened November 26, 1894
 Tovarnaya line, opened May 1904

The route of the line in the Saint Petersburg area is difficult to follow because various changes were made between 1894 and 1928. Of particular note was the closure of Primorsky Rail Terminal (due to flooding) in 1924 and the re-routing of trains to Finlyandsky Rail Terminal.

Technical stops
For technical needs and for travel of trains technical stops were necessary.

Rolling stock
In the late 19th and early 20th centuries, steam tram engines were used, as shown below.

People

References

Railway stations in the Russian Empire opened in 1847
Railway stations in the Russian Empire opened in 1904
Railway stations closed in 1924
Railway stations closed in 1929
Railway stations in Saint Petersburg Railway Division
Railway stations in the Russian Empire opened in 1893
Railway lines in Russia
1520 mm gauge railways in Russia
1847 establishments in the Russian Empire